Gone with the River is a 2015 Venezuelan drama film directed by Mario Crespo. The film is spoken in Warao. It was selected as the Venezuelan entry for the Best Foreign Language Film at the 88th Academy Awards but it was not nominated.

Cast
 Eddie Gómez as Tarsicio
 Yordana Medrano as Dauna
 Diego Armando Salazar as Padre Julio

See also
 List of submissions to the 88th Academy Awards for Best Foreign Language Film
 List of Venezuelan submissions for the Academy Award for Best Foreign Language Film

References

External links
 

2015 films
2015 drama films
Venezuelan drama films
Warao-language films